Spoladea recurvalis, the beet webworm moth or Hawaiian beet webworm moth, is a species of moth of the family Crambidae. It is found worldwide, but mainly in the tropics.

The wingspan is 22–24 mm. The moth flies from May to September depending on the location.

The larvae feed on spinach, beet, cotton, maize and soybean. They feed on the underside of the leaves protected by a slight web. The larvae are green and resemble the ribs of the leaf somewhat. When fully grown, they are about 19 mm long.

The pupa is formed within a slight cocoon in a folded piece of leaf. It is very pale brown. The pupal period lasts about 12 days. Adult moths are nectarivores and capable of long-distance flights.

Gallery

References

External links
 Lepidoptera of Belgium
 Australian caterpillars 
 Spoladea recurvalis at UKMoths
 
 Cirrus Digital: Spoladea recurvalis – Beet webworm moth

Spilomelinae
Moths of Africa
Moths of Asia
Moths of Europe
Moths of Oceania
Moths of the Middle East
Moths of the Comoros
Moths of Japan
Moths of Madagascar
Moths of Mauritius
Moths of New Zealand
Moths of Réunion
Moths described in 1775
Taxa named by Johan Christian Fabricius
Articles containing video clips